Fengzhen is a county-level city under the administration of the prefecture-level city of Ulaan Chab, in the central portion of Inner Mongolia, China, bordering Shanxi province to the south.

Climate

Transportation
China National Highway 208

References

Cities in Inner Mongolia
County-level divisions of Inner Mongolia
Ulanqab